Lemon drop may refer to:

Food and drink

 Lemon drop (candy), a type of candy
 Lemon drop (cocktail), a vodka-based cocktail

Plants
 Lemon drop mangosteen, two species of trees
 Lemon drop pepper, a pepper variety
 Sunquat, also known as lemondrop, a variety of citrus fruit

Music
 Vintage V100MRPGM Lemon Drop, guitar
 "Lemon Drop", a bop standard tune written by George Wallington
 "Lemon Drop", a song by Logic from Supermarket

See also
 The Lemon Drop Kid, 1951 comedy film based on the short story of the same name by Damon Runyon 
 Lemon Drop Kid (born 1996), racehorse
 The Mighty Lemon Drops, an English rock band